The Hoodlum is a 1919 silent film comedy-drama produced by and starring Mary Pickford and released through First National. The film was directed by Sidney A. Franklin and was based on the novel Burkeses Amy by Julie Mathilde Lippmann.

Plot
Spoiled Amy Burke (Mary Pickford) lives with her doting grandfather, ruthless business magnate Alexander Guthrie (Ralph Lewis), in his Fifth Avenue, New York City mansion. She is initially delighted when he offers to take her with him on a trip to Europe. However, as the day approaches for their departure, she changes her mind and decides to go live with her newly returned father, "sociological writer" John Burke (T. D. Crittenden), at Craigen Street, wherever that is. Unused to having his plans thwarted, Guthrie becomes cold to his beloved granddaughter.

Craigen Street turns out to be in one of the slums of lower New York, the subject of her father's study. At first, Amy is horrified by the squalor. She makes it clear to a couple of friendly young women who want to become acquainted and to Nora (Aggie Herring), her father's cook and servant, that she feels she is far above them. Deeply unhappy, she eventually takes her father's advice to treat their neighbors as equals. She fits in after several weeks. She makes friends with boy inventor Dish Lowry and young man William Turner (Kenneth Harlan), a reclusive neighbor. Amy also ends a years-long feud between Irishman Pat O'Shaughnessy (Andrew Arbuckle) and Jew Abram Isaacs (Max Davidson) through good-natured trickery.

When a policeman is alerted by a sore loser to her game of craps in the street, she escapes by hiding under the cloak of newcomer Peter Cooper, who takes a room on the floor above the Burkes'. Unbeknownst to Amy, the new resident is actually her grandfather in disguise, come to see how she is doing. He is initially disgusted with her behavior, noting on paper that she "has become a hoodlum". When Amy takes a sick mother and her children under her wing, she asks Cooper to look after a baby, only to be brusquely rebuffed. Cooper has a change of heart, however, and adopts a whole new, more benevolent attitude, much to Amy's delight. He returns to his mansion a changed man (taking along Dish Lowry).

One night, Amy spots a thief in Turner's room. The intruder flees. Turner informs Amy that it was no thief but an agent of Alexander Guthrie looking for his writings. Guthrie framed him to hide corrupt business practices, resulting in a year in the penitentiary. Amy and Turner break into her grandfather's mansion to try to steal evidence that would prove him innocent, but set off a burglar alarm and are caught. When Guthrie recognizes Amy, he has Turner freed and offers to exonerate him. Afterward, Amy and Turner are married.

Cast
Mary Pickford as Amy Burke
Ralph Lewis as Alexander Guthrie / "Peter Cooper"
Kenneth Harlan as William Turner
T. D. Crittenden as John Burke
Aggie Herring as Nora
Andrew Arbuckle as Pat O'Shaughnessy
Max Davidson as Abram Isaacs
Paul Mullen as The Pugilist
Buddy Messinger as Dish Lowry
Ralph Lewis as Alexander Guthrie

Public service announcement
At least some prints of the film open with Pickford in a public service announcement for World War I war savings stamps.

Preservation
The Hoodlum was preserved by the Academy Film Archive in 1998.

Home media
The film is in the public domain. It has been released on DVD and Blu-ray.

See also
Mary Pickford filmography

References

External links

 
 
 
 
 The Hoodlum available for download at Internet Archive
 
 lantern slide(archived)

1919 films
American silent feature films
Films directed by Sidney Franklin
Films based on American novels
Films set in New York City
First National Pictures films
American black-and-white films
Articles containing video clips
1910s English-language films
1919 comedy-drama films
1910s American films
Silent American comedy-drama films